The 1987 Virginia Slims World Championship Series was the 15th season of the tennis circuit since the foundation of the Women's Tennis Association. It commenced in January, 1987, and concluded in December, 1987 after events.

The Virginia Slims World Championship Series was the elite tour for professional women's tennis organised by the Women's Tennis Association (WTA). It was held in place of the WTA Tour from 1983 until 1987 and featured tournaments that had previously been part of the Toyota Series and the Avon Series. It included the four Grand Slam tournaments and a series of other events. ITF tournaments were not part of the tour, although they awarded points for the WTA World Ranking.

Schedule 
The table below shows the 1987 Virginia Slims World Championship Series schedule.

Key

December

January

February

March

April

May

June

July

August

September

October

November

Rankings

WTA 
Below are the 1987 WTA year-end rankings (December 20, 1987) in both singles and doubles competition:

Virginia Slims

Statistical information

Titles won by player 
These tables present the number of singles (S), doubles (D), and mixed doubles (X) titles won by each player and each nation during the season, within all the tournament categories of the 1987 Virginia Slims World Championship Series: the Grand Slam tournaments, the Year-end championships and regular events. The players/nations are sorted by:

 total number of titles (a doubles title won by two players representing the same nation counts as only one win for the nation);
 highest amount of highest category tournaments (for example, having a single Grand Slam gives preference over any kind of combination without a Grand Slam title); 
 a singles > doubles > mixed doubles hierarchy; 
 alphabetical order (by family names for players).

Titles won by nation

See also 
 1987 Nabisco Grand Prix
 Women's Tennis Association
 International Tennis Federation

References

External links 
 Official WTA Tour website

 
Virginia Slims World Championship Series
1987 WTA Tour